Bristol is a city in the State of Tennessee. Located in Sullivan County, its population was 26,702 at the 2010 census. It is the twin city of Bristol, Virginia, which lies directly across the state line between Tennessee and Virginia. The boundary between the two cities is also the state line, which runs along State Street in their common downtown district. Bristol is a principal city of the Kingsport−Bristol−Bristol, TN-VA metropolitan statistical area, which is a component of the Johnson City−Kingsport−Bristol, TN-VA combined statistical area − commonly known as the "Tri-Cities" region.

Bristol is probably best known for being the site of some of the first commercial recordings of country music, showcasing Jimmie Rodgers and the Carter Family, and later a favorite venue of mountain musician Uncle Charlie Osborne. The U.S. Congress recognized Bristol as the "Birthplace of Country Music" in 1998, and the Birthplace of Country Music Museum is located in Bristol. It also is the birthplace of Tennessee Ernie Ford.

Bristol is also the site of Bristol Motor Speedway, a NASCAR short track that is one of the best-known motorsports facilities in the country.

The world's fifth-largest coal producer, Contura Energy, is based in Bristol.

History
Before 1852, Bristol was owned by Reverend James King. His son-in-law, Mr. Joseph R. Anderson, bought 100 acres of the plantation, and named it Bristol  The G.W. Blackley House, one of the oldest houses in Bristol, was constructed in 1869.

"Birthplace of Country Music"

The U.S. Congress declared Bristol to be the "Birthplace of Country Music", according to a resolution passed in 1998, recognizing its contributions to early country music recordings and influence, and the Birthplace of Country Music Museum is located in Bristol.

In 1927, record producer Ralph Peer of Victor Records began recording local musicians in Bristol, to attempt to capture the local sound of traditional "folk" music of the region. One of these local sounds was created by the Carter Family, who got their start on July 31, 1927, when A.P. Carter and his family journeyed from Maces Spring, Virginia, to Bristol to audition for Ralph Peer, who was seeking new talent for the relatively embryonic recording industry.  They received $50 for each song they recorded. That same visit by Peer to Bristol also resulted in the first recordings by Jimmie Rodgers.

Since 1994, the Birthplace of Country Music Alliance has promoted the city as a destination to learn about country music and the city's role in the creation of an entire music genre. The alliance is organizing the building of a new Cultural Heritage Center to help educate the public about the history of country music in the region. On August 1, 2014, the Birthplace of Country Music Museum opened in Bristol, Virginia to commemorate the historical significance of the Bristol sessions. The museum features a 24,000-ft building that houses core exhibits, space for special exhibits, a performance theater, and a radio station.

Every year, during the third weekend in September, a music festival called the Bristol Rhythm & Roots Reunion takes place. The festival is held downtown, where Tennessee and Virginia meet, and it celebrates Bristol's heritage as the birthplace of country music.

Geography
Bristol is located in the northeast corner of Tennessee, at  (36.569135, −82.197489).

Bristol is located 20.95 miles east of Kingsport, Tennessee, 21.51 miles northeast of Johnson City, Tennessee, 38.74 miles northwest of Boone, North Carolina, 105.96 miles northeast of Knoxville, Tennessee, and 132.61 miles southwest of Roanoke, Virginia.

Climate
Like much of the rest of the state, Bristol has a humid subtropical climate (Köppen climate classification: Cfa), although with significantly cooler temperatures, especially in the summer, due to elevation; it is part of USDA hardiness zone 6b, with areas to the southwest falling in zone 7a.

Precipitation is low compared to much of East Tennessee, averaging  annually, and reaches a low during autumn.

Notes

Demographics

2020 census

As of the 2020 United States census, there were 27,147 people, 11,450 households, and 6,808 families residing in the city.

2000 census
As of the census of 2000,  24,821 people, 10,648 households, and 6,825 families were residing in the city. The population density in 2000 was 846 people per square mile (326.5/km). The 11,511 housing units averaged 392.2 per square mile (151.4/km). The racial makeup of the city was 95.15% White, 2.97% African American, 0.31% Native American, 0.64% Asian,  0.24% from other races, and 0.70% from two or more races. Hispanics or Latinos of any race were 0.68% of the population.

Of the 10,648 households,  26.2% had children under the age of 18 living with them, 49.0% were married couples living together, 11.4% had a female householder with no husband present, and 35.9% were not families. Nearly 32% of all households were made up of individuals, and 14.1% had someone living alone who was 65 years of age or older. The average household size was 2.26, and the average family size was 2.84.

In the city, the age distribution was 21.1% under 18, 9.1% from 18 to 24, 27.2% from 25 to 44, 24.7% from 45 to 64, and 17.9% who were 65 or older. The median age was 40 years. For every 100 females, there were 90.6 males. For every 100 females age 18 and over, there were 87.3 males.

The median income for a household in the city was $30,039, and for a family was $37,341. Males had a median income of $28,210 versus $21,173 for females. The per capita income for the city was $18,535. About 11.5% of families and 15.0% of the population were below the poverty line, including 19.4% of those under age 18 and 12.0% of those age 65 or over.

Professional sports

Bristol is the location of Bristol Motor Speedway, a motorsports venue that hosts several NASCAR events. It is also home to Bristol Dragway, which hosts the Ford Thunder Valley Nationals, an NHRA national event.

A Pittsburgh Pirates rookie Minor League Baseball affiliate, the Bristol Pirates, played its home games at DeVault Memorial Stadium in Bristol, Virginia, from 1969 to 2020. In conjunction with a contraction of Minor League Baseball beginning with the 2021 season, the Appalachian League, in which the Pirates played, was reorganized as a collegiate summer baseball league, and the Pirates were replaced by a new franchise in the revamped league designed for rising college freshman and sophomores.

Media
Television:
 WCYB-TV (NBC Channel 5.1)
 WCYB-DT2 (CW Channel 5.2)
 WEMT-TV  (FOX Channel 39.1)
Note-WEMT is licensed to Greeneville, Tennessee, but co-located with sister station WCYB-TV.

Radio:
WZAP (AM 690 kHz) Christian
WFHG (FM 92.9 MHz) SuperTalk WFHG
WWTB (AM 980 kHz) The Sports Fox
WXBQ (FM 96.9 MHz) Twenty-four Carrot Country
WAEZ (FM 94.9 MHz) Electric 94.9
WEXX (FM 99.3 MHz) The X 99.3
WTFM (FM 98.5 MHz) WTFM 98.5
WBCM-LP (FM 100.1 MHz) WBCM Radio Bristol

Newspaper:
Bristol Herald Courier

Education

Colleges and universities
King University
Graham Bible College

Primary and secondary schools
Bristol Tennessee City Schools operates public schools serving almost all of the city, with Tennessee High School being its public high school. Small sections are in the Sullivan County School District.

Police department
The Bristol Police Department is the municipal law enforcement agency for the city.  The BPD has 69 sworn officers and 25 civilian support staff. It also makes use of citizen volunteers as an auxiliary staff that saves the department over $100,000 annually.

Notable people
Clarence Ashley, old-time musician
George Lafayette Carter, entrepreneur
John I. Cox, Governor of Tennessee (1905−1907)
Cara Cunningham, internet celebrity/blogger
Tennessee Ernie Ford, singer, actor, entertainer 
Justin Grimm, professional baseball player for the Oakland Athletics
Doyle Lawson, Grammy-nominated bluegrass musician and front man of Doyle Lawson and Quicksilver
Dave Loggins, songwriter, recording artist
David Massengill, folk singer/songwriter
Jayma Mays, actress
Ricky Morton, professional wrestler and WWE Hall of Famer. One half of tag team Rock N Roll Express
Chase Owens, professional wrestler
Davyd Whaley, American painter

See also
Rader v. State (1880)

References

Further reading
Phillips, V.N. Bud. (1992) Bristol Tennessee/Virginia: A History-1852-1900. Johnson City: Overmountain Press.

External links

City of Bristol Official Home Page

Municipal Technical Advisory Service entry for Bristol – information on local officials, elections, and link to charter

 
Cities in Tennessee
Cities in Sullivan County, Tennessee
Divided cities
East Tennessee
Twin cities
Kingsport–Bristol metropolitan area